Aosdána (from , 'people of the arts') is an Irish association of artists. It was created in 1981 on the initiative of a group of writers with support from the country's Arts Council. Membership, which is by invitation from current members, is limited to 250 individuals; before 2005 it was limited to 200. Its governing body is called the Toscaireacht.

Formation
Aosdána was originally set up on the suggestion of writer Anthony Cronin, by Taoiseach Charles Haughey, well known for his support for the Arts, although Fintan O'Toole has argued that this also served to deflect criticism of Haughey's political actions.

Membership

The process of induction relies entirely on members proposing new members. Applications by artists themselves are not allowed.

Cnuas
Some members of Aosdána receive a stipend, called the Cnuas (a gift of financial aid put aside for the purpose of support), from the Arts Council of Ireland. This stipend is intended to allow recipients to work full-time at their art. The value of the Cnuas in 2021 was €20,180 (about £17,000 or US$23,000).

Saoi

The title of Saoi (lit. "wise one") is the highest honour that members of Aosdána can bestow upon a fellow member. No more than seven living members can be so honoured at one time. The honour is conferred by the President of Ireland in a ceremony during which a gold torc is placed around the neck of the recipient by the President.

, the current living Saoithe are:
 Seóirse Bodley, composer
 Imogen Stuart, sculptor
 George Morrison, film-maker 
 Edna O'Brien, writer 
 Roger Doyle, composer
 Eiléan Ní Chuilleanáin, poet

Among the deceased holders of the title of Saoi are the Nobel Laureates Samuel Beckett and Seamus Heaney, dramatists Brian Friel and Tom Murphy, and the artists Patrick Scott, Louis le Brocquy, and Camille Souter.

The poet Pearse Hutchinson, a member of Aosdána, described it as "a miracle and a godsend" that allowed him to continue writing at a time when he might have had to give up. Composer Roger Doyle has also spoken about the difference it made: "I was elected to Aosdána in 1986. This gave me a small stipend from the Government each year, which enabled me to devote all my time to composing. This changed my life for the better and I have composed non-stop since then."

Toscaireacht
The Toscaireacht ("delegation") is a committee of ten members, called Toscairí, of the Aosdána. It meets several times a year to deal with the administration and external relations of Aosdána, reports to every General Assembly, which meets once a year, and sets its Agenda. When new members of Aosdána are proposed, the Toscairí have the task of verifying that the nomination process has been complied with, and also that the candidate is willing to accept membership, before the next stage of election is begun.

Elections
Toscairí are elected to the Toscaireacht by the members of Aosdána for two years at a time. All members of Aosdána are eligible for election, and nominations must be made in writing by three members. The electoral process is in two stages. First, within each of Aosdána's three disciplines (Music, Literature, and Visual Arts), the two nominees with the highest number of votes are elected: this guarantees a minimum of two Toscairí from each of the disciplines. Next, the remaining four places are filled by the remaining nominees from any discipline who have the highest number of votes.

Meetings
The procedure at meetings is laid down in the Toscaireacht's Standing Orders. Minutes of its meetings appear on Aosdána's web site.

Current Toscairí
, the Toscaireacht members are:
Eamon Colman (Visual Arts)
Theo Dorgan (Literature)
Anne Haverty (Literature)
Michael Holohan (Music)
Anne Tallentire (Visual Arts)
Grainne Mulvey (Music)
Vivienne Dick (Visual Arts)
Cathy Carman (Visual Arts)
Gerard Smyth (Literature)
Enda Wyley (Literature)

See also
 List of members of Aosdána

References

External links
 Aosdána website

 
Irish artist groups and collectives
Academies of arts
Learned societies of Ireland
1981 establishments in Ireland